The 2011–12 I-League was the fifth season of the I-League. The season began in October 2011 and ended in May 2012. Salgaocar are the defending champions, having won their maiden title in the previous season.

The current edition has a total of 14 teams contesting for the honors. These include the top twelve teams from the 2010–11 season along with the two promoted sides, Shillong Lajong and Sporting Clube de Goa, who had been the winner and the runner-up in the 2011 I-League 2nd Division respectively.

Teams
According to the AIFF's rules, the two bottom-most teams from the 2010–11 season-ending points table were supposed to be relegated to the second tier, but in actuality, only ONGC FC were relegated after their second to last place finish, while the team finishing the last, JCT FC decided to disband their senior football team at the close of the session.

Shillong Lajong FC and Sporting Clube de Goa, the Champions & Runner-up respectively, of the 2011 I-League 2nd Division, were promoted to the I-League after being relegated only the previous year.

Stadiums and locations

Managerial changes
In chronological order from the bottom

Foreign players

Ownership changes

1:  Anglian Holdings only brought 20% in Shillong Lajong. The rest of the club is still owned by Shillong Lajong plc.

League table

Season charity
IMG Reliance and the I-League have joined hands with the polio eradication campaign India Unite to End Polio Now. IUEPN is an initiative of Aidmatrix Foundation, supported by UNICEF, and a collaborative effort between the Ministry of Health and Family Welfare (MOHFW), World Health Organization (WHO), National Polio Surveillance Project (NPSP), Rotary International and US Centre for Disease Control (CDC).

Season statistics

Top scorers

Top Indian scorers

Hat-tricks

Scoring
First goal of the season: C.K. Vineeth for Chirag United Club Kerala against HAL (22 October 2011)
Fastest goal of the season: 3 minutes – Anthony Pereira for Dempo against Shillong Lajong (23 November 2011)
Widest winning margin: 7 goals
HAL 1-8 East Bengal (23 November 2011)
Most goals scored in a match by a single team: 10 goals
 Pune 6-4 HAL (10 April 2012)
Most goals scored in a match by a losing team: 4 goals
Pune 6-4 HAL (10 April 2012)
Most goals scored in a match by a single player: 4 goals
 Tolgay Özbey for East Bengal against HAL (23 November 2011)
 Gbeneme Friday for Mumbai against HAL (14 April 2012)

End-of-season awards
 Fan's Player of the Year —  Francis Fernandes
 FPAI Young Player of the Year —  Manandeep Singh
 FPAI Foreign Player of the Year —  Ranti Martins
 FPAI Indian Player of the Year —  Syed Rahim Nabi
 FPAI Coach of the Year —  Trevor Morgan

FPAI Team of the Year
Formation: 4-4-2

Notes

References

 
I-League seasons
1
India